Tom Elliott (born 22 November 1967) is an Australian banker and a radio and television personality. He is best known as the host of the Drive program on 3AW.

Career
Elliott was born on November 22, 1967, the eldest of the three children of prominent businessman and future Liberal Party treasurer John Elliott and his wife Lorraine Elliott, a future Victorian state Liberal parliamentarian.  His parents later divorced. He was educated at Carey Baptist Grammar School, Kew from 1973 to 1985, and the University of Melbourne from 1986 to 1988, where he graduated with a Bachelor of Commerce degree. He then worked in the banking industry in Toronto and New York City.

He was employed on the personal staff of Liberal politician Michael Wooldridge in 1990. From 1990 to 1992 he studied at the University of Oxford, gaining a Bachelor of Arts in Philosophy, Politics and Economics. On return to Australia he worked for the clothing retailer Country Road until 1996.  In the meantime he had started presenting a regular finance report on radio 3RRR.

From 1997 to 2001 he was Executive Director of the investment bank Flinders Capital. From 2001 he has been Managing Director of MM&E Capital. He has also been a Director of Beulah Capital since 2011.

Later media work included financial reports on radio 3AW, filling in for talk-back presenters Neil Mitchell and Derryn Hinch, and television appearances on Channel 10's The Project, and Channel 7's Sunrise program. Elliott also filed editorial pieces for the Herald Sun for four years. Since 2013 he has been the presenter of the Drive program on 3AW.

Personal life
Elliott is married to TV presenter and journalist Elise Elliott (née Mooney). They have a daughter, Ava.

Similarly to his father, who was club president for almost twenty years, he is a fervent supporter of the Carlton Football Club.

References

Living people
1967 births
Australian investment bankers
Australian radio presenters
Australian television presenters
University of Melbourne alumni
Alumni of the University of Oxford
Businesspeople from Melbourne
People educated at Carey Baptist Grammar School
Australian people of Cornish descent
3AW presenters
Radio personalities from Melbourne